Hypolycaena antifaunus, the large fairy hairstreak, is a butterfly in the family Lycaenidae which is native to the African tropics and subtropics.

Range
It is found in Guinea, Sierra Leone, Liberia, Ivory Coast, Ghana, Togo, Nigeria, Cameroon, the Republic of the Congo, the Central African Republic, Angola, the Democratic Republic of the Congo, Uganda, Kenya, Tanzania and Zambia.

Habitat and habits
The habitat consists of primary forests. Adult males mud-puddle.

Subspecies
Hypolycaena antifaunus antifaunus — Guinea, Sierra Leone, Liberia, Ivory Coast, Ghana, Togo, Nigeria: south and the Cross River loop, Cameroon, Congo, Central African Republic, Angola, Democratic Republic of the Congo, north-western Zambia
Hypolycaena antifaunus latimacula (Joicey & Talbot, 1921) — Democratic Republic of the Congo: Kivu, Uganda, western Kenya, western Tanzania

References

Butterflies described in 1851
Hypolycaenini